This list represents television programmes that have aired on the Sky Sci-Fi channel in the United Kingdom.

First-run programming
Day Of The Dead
SurrealEstate
From
Chucky
Train
Monstrous
Reginald The Vampire

Repeat programming
Alphas
A Discovery of Witches
Firefly
Dark Matter
Fringe
Futurama
Fortitude
Human Target
Intergalactic
Grimm
Merlin
Project Blue Book
Wynonna Earp
The Leftovers
Manifest
Westworld (season 1 and 2)
Watchmen
Killjoys
The Outpost
Pandora
Penny Dreadful: City of Angels
Siren
Star Trek: Deep Space Nine
Star Trek: The Next Generation
Star Trek: Enterprise
Stargate SG-1
Spides
Stargate Atlantis
Stan Lee's Lucky Man
The Twilight Zone
Trickster
The Librarians
Star Trek: Voyager
True Blood
V
Stephen King's It

No longer aired
3rd Rock from the Sun
Andromeda
The Bionic Woman
Blake's 7
Century City
Continuum
The Day of the Triffids
Doctor Who
 Eastwick
Eli Stone
Farscape
La Femme Nikita
Flash Gordon
Guyver
Heroes
The Incredible Hulk
John Doe
 Knight Rider
Knightmare
The Last Train
Lois & Clark: The New Adventures of Superman
The Lost World
Medium
Mysterious Ways
Mystery Science Theater 3000
Neon Genesis Evangelion
Poltergeist: The Legacy
The Pretender
Profiler
Push, Nevada
Quantum Leap
Ripley's Believe It or Not!
Roswell
SeaQuest DSV
The Sentinel
She Spies
The Six Million Dollar Man
Sliders
Star Trek: The Animated Series 
Swamp Thing
Tales of the Unexpected
Thunderbirds
A Town Called Eureka
Tru Calling
The Exorcist
The Twilight Zone
Wonder Woman

See also
List of Syfy programs

External links
Syfy UK: Shows

Syfy (British and Irish TV channel)
Syfy
Syfy (UK and Ireland)